The Kolozsmonostor Abbey was a Benedictine Christian monastery at Kolozsmonostor in Transylvania in the medieval Kingdom of Hungary (now Mănăștur in Cluj-Napoca in Romania). According to modern scholars' consensus, the monastery was established by Ladislaus I of Hungary before 1095.

Establishment 

The Kolozsvár Abbey was the first Benedictine monastery in Transylvania, but medieval documents contain contradictory information about its foundation. According to a royal charter issued in 1341, Ladislaus I of Hungary established it. However, a late 14th-century forged version of a 1263 charter stated that Béla I of Hungary had set up the abbey, while an excerpt made around 1430 from the same charter named Stephen I of Hungary as its founder. The two latters document also recorded that Ladislaus I of Hungary had made a large grant to the monastery. Historian György Györffy says, both Stephen I and Béla I were most probably copied from the list of the benefactors of the bishopric of Eger in a 1261 charter, although the reference to Béla I may have preserved a genuine tradition. Historians István Bóna, Elek Benkő and István Keul agree that the monastery was established by Ladislaus I before 1095.

History 

The monastery was dedicated to the Virgin Mary. 

The abbey developed into an important place of authentication.

References

Sources 

 
 
 
 
 
 

11th-century establishments in Hungary
Benedictine monasteries in Hungary
Medieval Transylvania